The Madngella, otherwise known as the Matngala or Hermit Hill tribe, are an indigenous Australian people of the Northern Territory, Australia.

Language
The Madngella spoke Matngele, one of the Eastern Daly languages, now extinct.

Country
The Madngella lived traditionally in the middle and lower reaches of the Daly River nearby to the Mulluk-Mulluk people. The Pongaponga lay to their north.

Social system
In the merbok system of ceremonial exchange, the Madngella used the words in a way that indicated the coastal provenance of the articles (ninymer) exchanged, north-easterly and south-westerly. Medrdokfrom the former direction was calledpork padaka, as opposed to the south-westerly merbok, called nim berinken, where berinken is a generic term used of tribes living south-west of the Madngella.

Circumcision
A technique used in native medicine by the Madngella to heal infections to the penis after ritual circumcision had been performed was described by the Norwegian ethnographer Knut Dahl.

History
The Madngella tribe had experienced intense culture shock in the wake of white settlement, whose effects over 50 years, according to who studied them in the early 1930s, had been to disintegrate many of their attachments to the traditional way of life.

Jesuit missionaries, after several endeavours to set up a station in the general area of the Daly River, eventually managed to establish a viable community at Hermit Hill.

Alternative names
 Madngella.
 Muttangulla.
 Matngelli.
 Hermit Hill tribe.

Notes

Citations

Sources

Aboriginal peoples of the Northern Territory